Langur-e Pain (also Romanized as Langūr-e Pā’īn; also known as Langūre-e Pā’īn and Pā’īn Langūr) is a village in Feyziyeh Rural District, in the Central District of Babol County, Mazandaran Province, Iran. At the 2006 census, its population was 663, in 162 families.

References 

Populated places in Babol County